Susanna Eises  (born 18 January 1991) is a Namibian women's international footballer who plays as a goalkeeper.

Eises started to play for the Okahandja Beauties FC. She was selected in 2006 for the Namibia women's national football team as a defender until she became a goalkeeper in mid-2011, a position she kept up to July 2012 until she was suspended.

Eises was part of the team at the 2014 African Women's Championship. On club level she plays for Khomas Nampol Ladies FC in Namibia.

References

1991 births
Living people
Namibian women's footballers
Namibia women's international footballers
Place of birth missing (living people)
Women's association football goalkeepers